This article contains the results of the Tipperary county hurling team in the Championship during the 2020s.

2020

2021

2022

References

External links
Tipperary GAA Fan site
Tipperary on Hoganstand.com
Tipperary GAA site
Premierview
Tipperary GAA Archives

2